The Berlin Society for Anthropology, Ethnology, and Prehistory (German: Berliner Gesellschaft für Anthropologie, Ethnologie und Urgeschichte) is a learned society for the study of anthropology, ethnology, and prehistory founded in Berlin by Adolf Bastian and Rudolf Virchow in 1869 as the Berlin Anthropological Society (German: Berliner Anthropologische Gesellschaft).

As a national organization, the German Society for Anthropology, Ethnology and Prehistory was founded in 1870, but dissolved in 1935. Before the inflation after the First World War, the company had considerable assets, which were gained from well-known foundations, such as that of Heinrich Schliemann. This made it possible for the company to financially support expeditions and excavations. Numerous holdings in Berlin museums go back to earlier research by the company and some of them are still legally owned by the company.

After the Second World War, the company was temporarily dissolved by the Allies and re-established in the early 1950s, particularly on the initiative of Hans Nevermann. Since then, the company has been organizing lectures, excursions and forums on a regular basis and promoting the exchange between scientists from different disciplines. The society annually awards the Rudolf Virchow Prize for excellent master's, master's and diploma theses from universities in Berlin and Brandenburg relating to the subjects represented in the society.

In 2021, the Journalist Markus Grill, with the support of the Society's head of archives Nils Seethaler, succeeded in finding skulls of Canadian aborigines in the Archaeological Centre of the National Museums that were thought to be missing from the Society's anthropological collection.

References

 Festschrift zum hundertjährigen Bestehen der Berliner Gesellschaft für Anthropologie, Ethnologie und Urgeschichte, 1869–1969, edited by Hermann Pohle and Gustav Mahr, vol. 1, Fachhistorische Beiträge. Berlin: Karl Flagel und Sohn, 1969.

External links
  (In German)

Learned societies of Germany
Anthropology organizations